was a feudal domain under the Tokugawa shogunate of Edo period Japan, located in Ise Province in what is part of now modern-day Suzuka, Mie. It was centered around Kanbe Castle. Kanbe Domain was controlled by fudai daimyō clans throughout most its history.

History
Under Toyotomi Hideyoshi, Kanbe Castle was held by Takigawa Katsutoshi as part of a 20,000 koku domain. However, as he sided with the Western Army in the Battle of Sekigahara, he was dispossessed by the victorious Tokugawa Ieyasu in 1600. Ichiyanagi Naomori was established as daimyō of the newly-created 50,000 koku Kanbe Domain under the Tokugawa shogunate in 1601. In 1636, Ichiyagani Naomori was awarded with a further increase in kokudaka and was transferred to Saijō Domain in Iyo Province and Kanbe reverted to tenryō status. During this time, much of Kanbe Castle was destroyed. The domain was revived in 1651 for Ichikawa Fusanaga, the younger son of the daimyō of Zeze Domain, who had been allowed to form a 10,000 koku cadet branch of the Ichikawa clan. He was awarded a further 10,000 koku for his services in the shogunal administration, and in 1736 his grandson was transferred to Shimodate Domain in Hitachi Province.

The Ishikawa were replaced by a cadet branch of the Honda clan from Kawachi Province, initially with 10,000 koku, and with an additional 5,000 koku added in 1745. The Honda clan would continue to rule Kanbe until the Meiji restoration. In 1748, Honda Tadamune, who served in the shogunal administration as a wakadoshiyori was allowed to rebuild Kanbe Castle. He was also a noted scholar, disciple of Ogyū Sorai, and master of the Japanese tea ceremony. He established the domain academy "Sankyodo" at Kanbe Castle, as a branch school called the "Narukusakan" in the clan's Edo residence. The fifth daimyō, Honda Tadataka, was also a Neo-Confucianist and changed the orientation of the academy to follow the Cheng–Zhu school, renaming the academy  "Kōrindō" at Kanbe and "Shintokudō" in Edo in 1813. The 1854 Tōkai earthquake caused great damage during the tenure of Honda Tadahiro. During the Boshin War, the domain quickly submitted to the imperial side under its final daimyō, Honda Tadatsura.

Holdings at the end of the Edo period
As with most domains in the han system, Kanbe Domain consisted of several discontinuous territories calculated to provide the assigned kokudaka, based on periodic cadastral surveys and projected agricultural yields.

Ise Province 
1 village in Mie District
14 villages in Kawawa District
4 villages in Suzuka District
Kawachi Province
11 villages in Nishigori District

List of daimyō

See also 
 List of Han
 Abolition of the han system

References

Domains of Japan
1601 establishments in Japan
1871 disestablishments in Japan
Ise Province
History of Mie Prefecture